Rain Forest International School (RFIS) is an international secondary school located on the outskirts of Yaoundé, the capital city of Cameroon. The school offers an international secondary education permeated with a Christian worldview, using English as the medium of instruction. It provides education for children of partner organizations and the children of parents with mission agencies and the greater expatriate and national communities in west central Sub-Saharan Africa.

It was established in 1991, and most of the staff are missionaries with some national teachers as well. The student population is roughly 50 percent expatriate and 50 percent national. Some of the extracurricular activities include soccer, volleyball, basketball, drama, drama evangelism, running club and student council.

External links

Secondary schools in Cameroon
Schools in Yaoundé
Educational institutions established in 1991
1991 establishments in Cameroon